Kamukara Purushothaman (4 December 1930 – 26 May 1995) was an Indian singer. He was a noted playback singer in Malayalam cinema during its early years. He has recorded over 170 songs in 68 movies in various South Indian languages.

Early life

Kamukara was born on 4 December 1930 in Thiruvattar in Kanyakumari district of present day Tamil Nadu. He was the son of Parameswara Kurup and Lekshmikkutty Amma. He started learning music from an early age under Karnatic music guru Thiruvattar Arumugham Pillai Bhagavathar, along with his sister, Leela Omchery, a known singer and musicologist. His career debut was at the local temple, Aadi Keshava Temple, Thiruvattar. He started music concerts by the age of 15 and became an artist at Trivandrum Broadcasting Corporation by the age of 20 and became active in All India Radio music programmes.

Career 
His first recording for a film was in 1953 for the Malayalam film, Ponkathir, a Merryland Studio production to start a film career which spanned over 20 years and 68 Malayalam (total 125) films. He was the leading male singer in Malayalam films during the 50s and 60s till K.J. Yesudas appeared on the scene. Two of his soulfully rendered songs, "Aathmavidyalayame" for the film Harishchandra and "Ekanthathayude" for Bhargavi Nilayam are widely considered to be among the all time great songs of Malayalam film music. He was a regular singer in Merryland films until the 1970s. Most of his songs were written by Thirunainar kurichi Madhavan Nair and composed by Brother Lakshmanan.

Later in his career, Kamukara Purushothaman, along with K. P. Udayabhanu and other senior singers formed a music troupe by name Old is Gold and performed stage programs all over India and abroad.

In 1983, he received the Kerala Sangeetha Nataka Akademi Award.

Death
Kamukara, who was a school teacher by profession, and retired as the Principal of Thiruvattar Govt. School, died suddenly on 26 May 1995 after suffering from a massive heart attack while on a journey to Thiruvananthapuram. He was aged 64 at the time of his death. He is survived by his wife, children, children-in-law and grandchildren.

Popular songs

Kamukara Awards
Kamukara Award is instituted in the  remembrance of Kamukara Purushothaman, to exemplary musicians. Awardees by the year are

. V Dakshinamoorthy, K Raghavan, P Leela,

KJ Yesudas,PJayachandran,  P Susheela, S Janaki, Vani Jairam, PB Sreenivas, MS Baburaj, B Vasantha, LR Eswari, KJ Joy, MS Viswanathan, MK Arjunan, MG Radhakrishnan, Shyam, KP Udhaya bhanu , P Madhuri , Ouseppachan , Sujatha Mohan and K.S.Chithra.

References

External links
 https://www.youtube.com/watch?v=bBddfe2C7U0 on YouTube
 http://www.devaragam.com/vbscript/MusicNew.aspx?ArtistID=113 on Devaragam
 http://www.raaga.com/channels/malayalam/album/MC0000054.html on Raaga
 https://www.youtube.com/watch?v=jj90iwKzvyY on YouTube
 https://www.youtube.com/watch?v=tQO10CdixFY on YouTube

Indian male playback singers
Malayalam playback singers
Malayali people
1930 births
1995 deaths
20th-century Indian singers
Singers from Tamil Nadu
People from Kanyakumari district
20th-century Indian male singers
Recipients of the Kerala Sangeetha Nataka Akademi Award